The I Cavalry Corps ( literally: Higher Cavalry Command 1) was a formation of the German Army in World War I. It was formed on the mobilization of the German Army in August 1914 and disbanded in March 1918.

I Cavalry Corps 

The Corps initially served on the Western Front with the Guards and 5th Cavalry Divisions and preceded the 3rd Army. By 15 September 1914, it was assigned to 2nd Army and comprised the Guards and 2nd Cavalry Divisions. Transferred to the East on 6 November 1914 and attached to the 9th Army. By 8 February 1915, it consisted of the 6th and 9th Cavalry Divisions.

At various times, the Corps was named for its commander as Cavalry Corps Richthofen, Corps Richthofen and Army Group Richthofen.

It remained with 9th Army until 20 November 1916, when it was redesignated as 56th Corps (z.b.V.).

56th Corps 
56th Corps (z.b.V.) was formed on 20 November 1916 by the redesignation of I Cavalry Corps. As the need for large mounted cavalry formations diminished as the war went on, the existing Cavalry Corps increasingly took on the characteristics of a normal Corps Command. This culminated in them being redesignated as "General Commands for Special Use" Generalkommandos zur besonderen Verwendung (Genkdo z.b.V.). 56th Corps was disbanded on 5 March 1918.

Order of Battle on mobilisation 
Initially, the Corps simply consisted of 2 Cavalry Divisions (with 3 Jäger battalions attached) without any Corps troops; in supply and administration matters, the Cavalry Divisions were entirely autonomous. The commander was only concerned with tactics and strategy, hence his title of Senior Cavalry Commander Höherer Kavallerie-Kommandeur.

On formation in August 1914, the Corps consisted of:
Guards Cavalry Division
5th Cavalry Division
11th Jäger Battalion
12th Jäger Battalion
13th Jäger Battalion

Each cavalry division consisted of 3 cavalry brigades (6 regiments each of 4 squadrons), a horse artillery Abteilung (3 four-gun batteries), a machine gun detachment (company size, 6 MGs), plus pioneers, signals and a motor vehicle column. A more detailed Table of Organisation and Equipment can be seen here. The Jäger battalions each consisted of 4 light infantry companies, 1 machine gun company (6 MGs), 1 cyclist company and a motorised vehicle column.

Commanders 
I Cavalry Corps / 56th Corps had the following commanders during its existence:

See also 

German Army (German Empire)
German Army order of battle (1914)
German cavalry in World War I
TOE, German Cavalry Division, August 1914

References

Bibliography 
 
 

Corps of Germany in World War I
Cavalry corps of Germany
Military units and formations established in 1914
Military units and formations disestablished in 1918

de:Höheres Kavallerie-Kommando